The  is a DC electric multiple unit (EMU) train type operated by the private railway operator Keisei Electric Railway on Skyliner limited express services to and from Narita International Airport in Japan via the Keisei Narita Airport Line.  The first set was delivered in May 2009, and entered service in July 2010, replacing the Keisei AE100 series EMUs previously used on these services.

Design 
Each 8-car set consists of six motored cars and two trailers. The trains are the first Keisei trains to use bolsterless bogies, and the end cars are equipped with active suspension. The train design and styling was overseen by Japanese fashion designer Kansai Yamamoto. The musical horn and in-train announcement melody are provided by Casiopea keyboardist and Ongakukan CEO Minoru Mukaiya.

The AE series design won the "Good Design Award" in 2010, and in May 2011 was awarded the 2011 Blue Ribbon Award, presented annually by the Japan Railfan Club.

Formation 
, the fleet consists of nine 8-car sets formed as shown below with car 1 at the Narita end.

 Cars 2, 4, 6, and 8 are each fitted with a single-arm pantograph.
 The "x" in the individual car numbering corresponds to the set number (1 to 9).

Interior 
All cars are monoclass, with 2+2 abreast rotating/reclining seating. Car 4 has a drink vending machine. Car 5 is equipped with a universal access toilet and also a wheelchair space.

History 
The AE series entered revenue service on Skyliner services from 17 July 2010.

Build details 
The manufacturers and delivery dates for the fleet are as shown below.

See also 
 E259 series, trains used on competing JR East Narita Express services

References

External links 

 Official site 
 Keisei AE series (Japan Railfan Magazine Online) 
 New Skyliner information on Nippon Sharyo website 

Nippon Sharyo multiple units
Keisei Electric Railway
Electric multiple units of Japan
Train-related introductions in 2010
1500 V DC multiple units of Japan
Tokyu Car multiple units